Carlos Rodríguez (born January 15, 1966) is a Spanish film director, producer, screenwriter and editor. He is the founder of Morgan Creativos, a creative studio based in Donostia-San Sebastian (Basque Country), especializing in audiovisual content for cultural events (museums, exhibitions, film festivals, live presentations...) and television.

Works:

1998 - Huellas de un espiritu (documentary)

1999 - Hitchcock: No Limit To Fiction (documentary) - Coppola, A Man And His Dreams (documentary)

2000 - Orson Welles In The Land Of Don Quixote  (documentary)

2001 - Huston & Joyce, A Dialogue With The Dead (documentary)

2002 - Encadenados (Links)  (documentary)

2003 - A Symphony in images (montage film)

2004 - Berlioz's Trip  (documentary)

2005 - Edward Hopper, el pintor del silencio (documentary)

2006 -  La Zona.

2007 - Camara negra  (short documentary film)

2009 - Ataque al poblado de La Hoya  (live action-animation short film)

2010 - Una historia del zinemaldia  (documentary TV series)

2011 - The Challenges  (video installation) - Open Sea  (video installation) - Berriro igo nauzu (shortfilm)

2012 - #VictoriaEugenia, The Social Network  (video installation)

2013 - 200 - San Sebastian 1813-2013  (video installation) - Bereterretxe (animated short film)

2014 - Comète, the escape network  (video installation)

2015 - #jazzaldia50 (documentary) - Dolomitas del Norte (video installation) - Ikimilikiliklik, the World of JA Artze (video installation)

2016 - DSS2016. The legacy (documentary) - DSS2016. Ship's Logbooks (video installation)

2018 - All Tomorrow's Libraries (video installation) - Uhain Berria (Documentary) -  Arrietakua (short documentary film)

2019 - Heriotza. Facing Death (video installation) - Basque Shepherding: yesterday and today (short documentary film)

References

External links 
 

1966 births
Living people
Spanish film directors
Spanish film producers